Otterswick is a hamlet on the island of Yell in the Shetland Islands, on the inlet of Otters Wick. It is on the east side of the island. There is also an "Otterswick" on Sanday in the Orkney Islands.

The surrounding area is a breeding ground of red-throated divers, and as the name suggests, there are many otters in the area.

The German ship Bohus was wrecked near here in 1924., and its figurehead, known as the "White Wife of Queyon" can be seen near the village. The original one, made of wood has rotted away, and it has been replaced by a fibreglass replica. Despite being a German boat, the Bohus was built in Grangemouth on the Firth of Forth, and was originally known as Bertha.

References

External links

Canmore - Otterswick, Yell, The White Lady of Queyon site record

Villages in Yell, Shetland